George Quincey Lumsden Jr. (born September 19, 1930) was a Career Foreign Service Officer who was the American Ambassador Extraordinary and Plenipotentiary to the United Arab Emirates from July 2, 1982 until January 28, 1986.

Early life
Born in Montclair, New Jersey, his family moved to Maplewood, New Jersey when he was a young child.  He attended the public schools there through the end of junior high school and he attended high school at Deerfield Academy.  He graduated from Princeton University in 1952 with a major in Psychology.  After he graduated, he joined the United States Navy, was accepted at the Officer Candidate School in Newport, Rhode Island and graduated from there in the Fall of 1952.  He spent his first two years as an engineering officer. His official rank was lieutenant.  When he returned to civilian life, he worked as a group service representative at Prudential Insurance Co. in Newark, New Jersey and Pittsburgh, Pennsylvania.

Lumsden left Prudential and entered Georgetown University’s School of Foreign Service in 1956, a year after he left the Navy.  He left after the end of his first year to enter the foreign service after having passed the exam.

Career
Prior to his nomination to be Ambassador, Lumsden held the following positions:
Program officer at the Department of State Reception Center in New York City
Consular officer in Izmir from 1959 to 1961
Economic officer in Bonn from 1962 to 1964
Consular-political officer in Amman from 1965 to 1967
From 1968 to 1969 he attended Arabic language and area studies in Beirut 
Chief of the Economic Section in Kuwait from 1969 to 1972
In Foggy Bottom, he was country officer for Kuwait, Bahrain, Qatar, and the United Arab Emirates from 1972 to 1975
General economic policy officer in Paris from 1976 to 1979
From 1979 until his appointment, he was Deputy Director of Arabian Peninsula Affairs in the Department

References

1930 births
Living people
People from Montclair, New Jersey
People from Maplewood, New Jersey
Deerfield Academy alumni
Military personnel from New Jersey
Princeton University alumni
Walsh School of Foreign Service alumni
Ambassadors of the United States to the United Arab Emirates